CEPC may refer to:

 Caribbean Programme for Economic Competitiveness, a Canadian Government programme covering historical good-relations and cooperation between the Commonwealth-Caribbean and the nation of Canada.
 Carpet Export Promotion Council, an agency of the Indian Ministry of Textiles
 Cashew Export Promotion Council of India, headquartered in the city of Kollam
  (Centre for Political and Constitutional Studies), an autonomous agency associated with the Ministry for the Presidency, Spain
 Certified Executive Pastry Chef ®, an American Culinary Federation (ACF) certification
 6-Chloro-5-ethoxy-N-(pyridin-2-yl)indoline-1-carboxamide, a pharmaceutical
 Circular Electron Positron Collider, a proposed particle accelerator in China
 Civil Emergency Planning Committee, NATO advisory body for the protection of civilian populations and the use of civil resources in support of NATO's objectives
 Crown Estate Paving Commission, the body responsible for managing certain aspects of the built environment around Regent's Park, London